Sir Ralph Cockayne Assheton, 1st Baronet   (13 September 1860 – 21 September 1955) was an English public official.

Biography

Early life
Ralph Cockayne Assheton was born in 1860 in Downham, Lancashire. His father was Ralph Assheton (1830–1907), who served as Member of Parliament for Clitheroe from 1868 to 1880, and his mother, Emily Augusta Feilden (1834–1916). His uncle was Joseph Feilden (1824–1895), who served as Member of Parliament for Blackburn from 1865 to 1869, and later MP for North Lancashire from 1880 to 1885. He attended Eton College and graduated from Jesus College, Cambridge.

Career
He served as a member of the Lancashire County Council in 1892, as well as Justice of the Peace for the West Riding of Yorkshire and Lancashire He also served as Deputy Lieutenant of Lancashire. He then served as Alderman of Lancashire from 1902 to 1949. Moreover, he served as High Sheriff of Lancashire in 1919.

He was created Baronet Assheton, of Downham on 4 September 1945.

Personal life
He married Mildred Estelle Sybella Master on 27 September 1898. They had four children:

Dorothy Winifred Assheton (1899–1972)
Ralph Assheton, 1st Baron Clitheroe (1901–1984)
Mary Monica Assheton (1903–1982)
Eleanor Assheton (1907–2000)

They resided at Downham Hall in Downham, where he was Lord of the manor. Lady Assheton was appointed a Commander of the Order of the British Empire in the 1934 New Year Honours, for political and public services in Lancashire. She died 18 August 1949.

Sir Ralph died in a Manchester hospital on 21 September 1955, following a short illness. The baronetcy was inherited by his only son, who had been created Baron Clitheroe a few months earlier, as part of the 1955 Birthday Honours.

References

1860 births
1955 deaths
People educated at Eton College
Members of Lancashire County Council
English justices of the peace
Alumni of Jesus College, Cambridge
Deputy Lieutenants of Lancashire
High Sheriffs of Lancashire
Baronets in the Baronetage of the United Kingdom
Ralph
Hulme Trust